Kevin R. Cleary is an American-born audio specialist who founded Cleary Sound in 1997.

Cleary got his start in sound production  at the Roseland Ballroom in New York City and began working for ESPN in 2007. During his time at ESPN, Cleary supported the X Games, NASCAR, and has garnered multiple awards for his work as a Technical Supervisor as well as Senior Audio Producer.

Awards
2015 Sports Emmy Award - Outstanding Trans-Media Sports Coverage 2016 College Football Playoff National Championship” Megacast-ESPN/ESPN3/ESPNU/ESPN Goal Line Kevin Cleary, Director 
2013 International Television and Film Awards - Best Technical Production Team "X Games Aspen 2012" ESPN Kevin Cleary, Senior Audio Producer
2012 Sports Emmy Award - Outstanding Technical Team-Remote "Winter X Games 16" ESPN 3D Kevin Cleary, Technical Supervisor
2011 Sports Emmy Award - Outstanding Technical Team-Remote "Winter X Games 15" ESPN 3D Kevin Cleary, Technical Supervisor
2011 Eclipse Award - Outstanding National Television Live Racing Programming - "The Breeders Cup" ESPN Kevin Cleary, Senior Audio Producer
2011 College Sports Media Awards - Professional Live Game or Event - "2011 Rose Bowl Wisconsin vs TCU" ESPN Kevin Cleary, Senior Audio Producer
2010 Eclipse Award - Outstanding National Television - Live Racing Programming - "The Breeders Cup" ESPN  Kevin Cleary, Senior Audio Producer
2009 Global Media Awards for College Sports - Best Live Game - College Football "#1Texas vs #7 Texas Tech” ESPN/ABC Kevin Cleary, Senior Audio Technician
2009 Eclipse Award - Outstanding National Television Live Racing Programming - "The Belmont Stakes on ABC"  Kevin Cleary, Senior Audio Producer
2008 Sports Emmy Award - Outstanding Technical Team-Studio "ESPN Nascar" ABC/ESPN/ESPN2 Kevin Cleary, Technical Supervisor
2007 Sports Emmy Award - Outstanding Technical Team-Remote "ESPN Nascar" ABC/ESPN/ESPN2  Kevin Cleary, Technical Supervisor

Kevin is a member of the Advanced Television Systems Committee (ATSC), the Audio Engineering Society (AES), The DTV Audio Group, the International Alliance of Theatrical Stage Employees IATSE Local One), and The Society of Motion Picture and Television Engineers (SMPTE).

References 

American audio engineers
Living people
Year of birth missing (living people)
Place of birth missing (living people)